Senator Valentine may refer to:

John K. Valentine (1904–1950), Iowa State Senate
John L. Valentine (fl. 1980s–2010s), Utah State Senate

See also
Freddy Valentín (fl. 1990s–2000s), Senate of Puerto Rico
Linda Valentino (born 1956), Maine State Senate